Lassina Diabaté (born 16 September 1974) is a Ivorian former professional footballer. He played for Ivory Coast and a few clubs in Europe. He played primarily as a defensive midfielder but could also play as a centre back.

Born in Bouaké, Ivory Coast, Diabaté played for several clubs in France, including Perpignan FC, Bordeaux and Auxerre. In his time at Bordeaux he won Ligue 1 in the 1998–99 season.

He was a participant at the 1998, 2000 and 2002 African Cup of Nations. He is best known for wearing fluorescent orange soccer boots, before such designs became fashionable. Diabaté was signed by Portsmouth in October 2002. During his time in England with Portsmouth his manager Harry Redknapp described him as being "as hard as iron" and said: "I wouldn't want to be a striker playing against him, he is a wonderfully aggressive player who controls the midfield for us". He made 25 league appearances during Portsmouth's 2002–03 season after which they were promoted to the Premier League.

He often struggled with injuries at various points in his career, which limited the amount of time he spent at each club. He failed to score a single goal in the last 7 years of his career.

References

External links
 
 

1974 births
Living people
People from Bouaké
Association football midfielders
Ivorian footballers
Ivory Coast international footballers
1998 African Cup of Nations players
2000 African Cup of Nations players
2002 African Cup of Nations players
Ligue 1 players
English Football League players
Belgian Pro League players
Olympique Alès players
FC Girondins de Bordeaux players
AJ Auxerre players
Portsmouth F.C. players
AC Ajaccio players
Sint-Truidense V.V. players
FC Lausanne-Sport players
AS Cannes players
Bourges 18 players
Canet Roussillon FC players
Louhans-Cuiseaux FC players
Ivorian expatriate footballers
Expatriate footballers in France
Expatriate footballers in Switzerland
Expatriate footballers in Belgium
Expatriate footballers in England